Weinroth is a surname. Notable people with the surname include:

 Avi Weinroth (born 1963), Israeli lawyer
 Maggie Weinroth
 Jacob Weinroth (1947–2018), Israeli attorney

See also
 Winroth